Agha Iftikhar Ahmad (born 4 November 1950) is a Pakistani research journalist and a political activist. Ahmad started his career in 1980, after his release from jail and joined Jang Media Network and held a senior position in the Network. Ahmad is currently serving as Director of Elections, Investigations, Special Projects, and Research (EISPAR) for the Geo News Network (GNN). Iftikhar Ahmad also hosted interview show Jawab Deyh (or in English "Answerable!") on Geo News TV channel for over 10 years.

Iftikhar Ahmad joined BOL Network as Senior Executive Vice President and Senior Anchorperson in BOL News on 18 October 2014. On 23 May 2015, Kamran Khan, Asma Shirazi and Iftikhar Ahmad left BOL Network due to corruption allegations on Axact company which was the parent company of  Bol News TV channel. He then joined Dunya News but soon left. As of 2019, he is affiliated with 24 News HD.

Early life and education 
Born in 1950, Iftikhar Ahmad was educated in Lahore, West-Pakistan. He obtained his early education from Multan. He attended Central Model School, Lahore, MAO College, Lahore and the University of the Punjab.

Political activity 

Since 1967, Iftikhar Ahmad has been a political activist as well. He participated in the movement against military dictator Field Marshal Ayub Khan.

His political philosophy was very much in line with the socialist ideas and he was mesmerised by Zulfikar Ali Bhutto. He wrote his undergraduate thesis advocating the socialist ideas and its role in modern societies. In 1973, Ahmad wrote his thesis supporting Bhutto's socialist economics policies and advocating for the need of socialism in the country. Ahmad served multiple jail terms under the martial law governments for various violations of Legal Framework Order, 1970. He was sent to the Sibi Central Jail, Shahpur Central Jail, Camp Jail, Lahore and the Lahore Fort detention center. Ahmad has also served as adviser to two Chief Ministers and one Governor of Punjab. His political philosophy is that the real political divide is always between the poor and the rich. He argues that Pakistan may never see a leader better than Zulfikar Ali Bhutto, and a political slogan better than "Roti, Kapra aur Makan". With over 30 years of experience in journalism, Iftikhar Ahmad is known for his probing and aggressive style of journalism.

Career 
Iftikhar Ahmad started his journalism career in 1982 from newspaper Subh-o Khair and worked for various publications including Daily Aftab and Daily Pakistan. He has been working for Daily Jang since 1986. In the 1980s,  Ahmad introduced personal interviews of politicians; these were different in the way that for the first time politicians divulged private information as well. Ahmad through his interviews for Daily Jang set a new trend in Pakistani journalism.

Ahmad started Jang Group's Election Cell in 1988, and had covered more than five political elections and also Geo Election Cell in the General Elections of 2002, 2008 and 2013 in Pakistan.

Ahmad also worked closely with the Geo News Administration and a fellow friend and journalist Hamid Mir on the Zara Sochiye social awareness campaign on Geo News TV channel. A campaign which aimed to start a debate on issues that divide the Pakistani nation, after the broadcast of the debate on Hudood Ordinance, the National Assembly of Pakistan ratified the Hudood Ordinances.

Controversy: Pleading the case for Bhutto 

Ahmad, through his program, Jawabdeh has questioned several key power players of the coup d'état staged by General Zia-ul-Haq and the subsequent hanging of the then elected Prime Minister Zulfikar Ali Bhutto (see Operation Fair Play).

In these interviews, some of these people, closely worked with General Zia-ul-Haq, spilled the beans about General Zia Ul-Haq real political intentions. In his programme, former Justice Naseem Hassan Shah, who was a member of the bench of Pakistan Supreme Court which upheld Bhutto's death sentence, admitted that he should have voted against the hanging and felt bad for not doing so. Justice Shah also admitted that there was not enough evidence to put Bhutto on death row. It was the political pressure by General Zia-ul-Haq that manipulated the decision. Those who voted against the decision, such as Justice Fakh-ruddin Ebrahim and Justice Dourab Framroze Patel, General Zia-ul-Haq insulted them, and forcefully retired them from their services.

His Interview of Naseem Hassan Shah led to the PPP to make the decision to file for the reopening of the case of Zulfikar Ali Bhutto. The interview also served as the basis of a lawsuit against Justice Naseem Hassan Shah in which the claimant claimed that after Justice Naseem Hassan Shah's admission in the interview that the decision to hang "Bhutto Sahib" had been forced upon them by Zia-ul-Haq.

Resignation in protest 
It was reported on 17 November 2008 that he resigned from Geo TV in protest over its refusal to broadcast his interview with Shahid Masood. He alleged that he was earlier pressured to censor certain portions of the said interview, which he declined.

The Geo TV administration retracted from their position and the complete interview was broadcast the following week. After the program went on the air, Ahmad took back his resignation. He resigned from Dunya News on 14 October 2015 when Dunya News top men were putting pressure on him to announce fabricated results about NA-122 contest (an election district) while he took a stance that he would only announce figures of votes that were coming from reporters, instead of engineering a high figure of difference between two major candidates.
According to sources, Ahmad was of the view that 'manipulation-of-election-results' difference between two major contestants before the actual results come in, was unprofessional and unethical.

Quotes
 Ahmad stated in Hamid Mir's Capital Talk show on Geo TV: "Pakistan may never see a leader better than Zulfikar Ali Bhutto, and a political slogan better than "Roti, Kapra aur Makan (Food, Clothes, and Home)".

See also 
List of Pakistani journalists
Hamid Mir

References

Pakistani male journalists
Living people
1950 births
Pakistani socialists
Pakistan People's Party politicians
Punjabi people
Pakistani democracy activists
Peoples Students Federation
Geo News newsreaders and journalists
Pakistani television journalists
Pakistani television hosts
University of the Punjab alumni
Government College University, Lahore alumni
Journalists from Lahore
Politicians from Lahore
BOL Network people
Pakistani prisoners and detainees